The Journal of Nervous and Mental Disease is a peer-reviewed medical journal on psychopathology. It was established in 1874 as the Chicago Journal of Nervous and Mental Disease. "Chicago" was dropped from the title beginning in 1876. Articles cover theory, etiology, therapy, and social impact of illness, and research methods.

Editors-in-chief 
The following people have been editors-in-chief of this journal:

See also 
 List of psychiatry journals

References

External links 
 

Publications established in 1874
Psychiatry journals
Lippincott Williams & Wilkins academic journals
English-language journals
Clinical psychology journals